Dedicated is a full-length album by New York City hardcore punk band Murphy's Law. It was released by Another Planet in 1996.

The album is dedicated to former bass player Chuck Valle, who was killed in 1994. His picture appears on the back page of the CD inlay and a picture of a tattoo inscribed with the words "In Memory of Chuck" appears on the jewel case inlay.

Production
The album was produced by Daniel Rey. He also wrote "Green Bud".

The personnel differed from previous efforts, but Jimmy G's vocals still provided the sound's basis.

Critical reception
The Washington Post wrote: "There's no evidence that the Law's energy is flagging; Todd Youth's guitar churns as fast as ever, and Jimmy G's vocals are just as raw and urgent. Still, the concept is a little tired."

Track listing
All songs written by Murphy's Law, unless stated
"Don't Bother Me" – 1:39
"Sarasota" – 2:32
"Dysfunctional Family"	– 1:46
"Shut Up" – 1:59
"The Plan" – 1:35
"Bitter" – 1:40
"Greenbud" (Daniel Rey) – 2:26
"What Will the Neighbors Think?" – 2:49
"Bag of Snacks" – 2:06
"Still Smokin'" – 2:42
"Stay Gold" – 2:27

Personnel 
 Jimmy "G" Drescher – vocals
 Todd "Youth" Schofield – guitar, backing vocals
 Dean Rispler – bass
 Eric "Goat" Arce – drums
 Seaton "Raven" Handcock – saxophone
 Jesse Malin – background vocals on "What Will The Neighbors Think?"
 Recorded at Spa Studio, New York City, US
 Produced by Daniel Rey
 Engineered by Hillary Johnson
 Assistant engineered by Patrick Shroads
 Mastered by Alan Douches at West West Side Music

References

External links
Murphy's Law official website

1996 albums
Murphy's Law (band) albums
Albums produced by Daniel Rey